Kelsall is a village in Cheshire, England. Kelsall may also refer to:

Kelsall (name), a list of people with the surname
Kelsall River, a North American river that runs through Alaska, Yukon, and British Columbia